William Jacobson (18 July 1803 – 13 July 1884) was Regius Professor of Divinity at Oxford University (1848–1865) and Bishop of Chester (1865–1884).

Life
The son of William Jacobson, a merchant's clerk, of Great Yarmouth, Norfolk, by his wife Judith, born Clarke, was born on 18 July 1803. His father died shortly after his birth, and his mother's second husband was a nonconformist. He was sent when about nine to a school at Norwich kept by Mr. Brewer, a baptist, the father of John Sherren Brewer. He went on to Homerton College, London, and in 1822–3 was a student at Glasgow University. On 3 May 1823 he was admitted commoner of St Edmund Hall, Oxford, being, it is said, befriended by Dawson Turner of Yarmouth, a member of the Society of Friends. He had little money. In May 1825 he was elected scholar of Lincoln College (B.A. in 1827), taking a second class in literæ humaniores.

Failing to win a fellowship at Exeter College, Jacobson was a private tutor in Ireland until 1829. He then returned to Oxford, obtained the Ellerton theological prize, was elected fellow at Exeter on 30 June, and proceeded M.A. On 6 June 1830 he was ordained deacon, was appointed to the curacy of St Mary Magdalen, Oxford, and was ordained priest the following year. In 1832 he was appointed vice-principal of Magdalen Hall, where he did much to encourage industry and enforce discipline. With a view to preparing an edition of the Patres Apostolici, he went at this period to Florence, Rome, and elsewhere to consult manuscripts. In 1836 he was offered a mastership at Harrow School by Charles Longley, the head-master, afterwards archbishop of York; but Longley was that year made Bishop of Ripon, nothing came of it. He offered himself as Longley's successor at Harrow, but was not appointed.

In 1839 Jacobson became perpetual curate of Iffley, near Oxford, was made public orator of the university in 1842, and was chosen select preacher in 1833, 1842, and 1863, but did not serve on the last occasion. By the advice of Lord John Russell, then prime minister, Jacobson was in 1848 promoted to the regius professorship of divinity at Oxford, which carried with it a canonry of Christ Church, Oxford and at that time also the rectory of Ewelme, Oxfordshire. In politics he was a liberal, and he was chairman of William Gladstone's election committee at Oxford in 1865. On 23 June 1865 he accepted the offer of the see of Chester, and was consecrated on 8 July.

In his charge at his primary visitation in October 1868 (published) Jacobson spoke on the duty of rubrical conformity. Although he had no liking for new  ritual, he made it clearly understood that he would discountenance prosecutions for ritualism. His call to conformity gave offence to some low churchmen, and in the earlier years of his episcopate he was twice mobbed by Orangemen in Liverpool when on his way to consecrate churches intended for the performance of an ornate service. He promoted the division of his diocese made by the foundation of the bishopric of Liverpool in 1880.

Failure of health caused Jacobson to resign his bishopric in February 1884; he was then in his eighty-first year. He died at the episcopal residence, Deeside, on Sunday morning, 13 July 1884. His portrait, painted by Richmond, has been engraved.

Works
Jacobson published:

 an edition of Alexander Nowell's Catechismus, with a Life, 1835, 1844;
 an edition of the extant writings of the Patres Apostolici, as S. Clementis Romani, S. Ignatii ... quæ supersunt, &c., 2 vols. 1838, 1840, 1847, 1863, a relevant to the genuineness of the longer recension of the Ignatian epistles (see William Cureton);
an edition of the Works of Robert Sanderson, 6 vols., 1854,

and a few shorter books, sermons, and charges. He also wrote annotations on the Acts of the Apostles for the Speaker's Commentary.

Family
Jacobson married, on 23 June 1836, Eleanor Jane, youngest daughter of Dawson Turner. By his wife, who survived him, he had ten children, of whom three sons and two daughters survived him.  Their son was the surgeon W. H. A. Jacobson.

References

Attribution

1803 births
1884 deaths
Bishops of Chester
Regius Professors of Divinity (University of Oxford)
Alumni of Homerton College, Cambridge
Alumni of St Edmund Hall, Oxford
Alumni of Lincoln College, Oxford
Fellows of Exeter College, Oxford
19th-century Church of England bishops
19th-century Anglican theologians